Joseph Gérard Yves Leduc (19 September 1908 – 1 February 1995) was a Liberal party member of the House of Commons of Canada. Born in Montreal, Quebec, he was a lawyer and professor of law by career.

He was first elected in a by-election at the Verdun riding on 22 March 1954 then elected there for a full term in the 1957 federal election. He was defeated by Harold Monteith of the Progressive Conservative party in the 1958 election.

References

External links
 

1908 births
1995 deaths
Lawyers from Montreal
Liberal Party of Canada MPs
Members of the House of Commons of Canada from Quebec
Politicians from Montreal